Clube Esportivo de Futebol, commonly known as Esportivo, is a Brazilian football team based in Passos, Minas Gerais state. They finished as the runners-up of the Série C once.

History
The club was founded on August 30, 1929. Esportivo won the Campeonato Mineiro Second Level in 1985. They competed in the Série C in 1988, when they were defeated in the final by União São João. After political conflicts in the city of Passos, former members of Clube Esportivo de Futebol founded Clube Esportivo Passense de Futebol e Cultura on January 23, 2001.

Achievements

 Campeonato Mineiro Second Level:
 Winners (1): 1985
 Série C:
 Runners-up (1): 1988

Stadium
Clube Esportivo de Futebol play their home games at Estádio Jorge Dias Oliva. The stadium has a maximum capacity of 5,000 people.

References

Association football clubs established in 1929
Football clubs in Minas Gerais
1929 establishments in Brazil